Apc is a village in Heves County,  Northern Hungary Region, Hungary.

Populated places in Heves County